Avane Nanna Ganda is a 1989 Kannada-language film starring Kashinath and Sudharani. The film was directed by S. Umesh and K. Prabhakar for Vijay Films.

Most of the film's cast and crew reprises from the 1988 film Avale Nanna Hendthi.

Cast
 Kashinath as Balu, Mahila vani paper editor 
 Sudharani as Mangala
 M. P. Shankar as pitaji 
 Sudheer 
 Vanitha Vasu as vanitha 
 Anjali Sudhakar
 Doddanna
 Sihi Kahi Chandru as vinayaka
 Mysore Lokesh
 Kaminidharan
Sukumar pervodi 
Sundar raj 
Pranava murthy 
Vishwa vijetha 
Uma shivakumar 
Pramila joshai 
Master Rohith 
C. R. Simha 
Neegro Johnny

Soundtrack
The film was declared a musical hit with the songs and lyrics composed and tuned by Hamsalekha.

References

1989 films
1980s Kannada-language films
Films scored by Hamsalekha